Othni is a Hebrew name meaning "lion of Jehovah". Othni of the Old Testament was a son of Shemaiah and was known as a “mighty man of valour”

Books of Chronicles people